Jakimovski or Jakimowski (Macedonian: Jaкимoвcки) is a Polish and Macedonian masculine surname, its feminine counterpart in Poland is Jakimowska. Alternative spellings include Yakimovsky, Yakimoski or Jakimovsky (male）and Yakimovskaya (female). The surname may refer to
Andrej Jakimovski (born 2001), Macedonian basketball player
Andrzej Jakimowski (born 1963), Polish film director, writer and producer
Blair Yakimoski, Canadian politician
Damjan Jakimovski (born 1995), Macedonian basketball player
Nikola Jakimovski (born 1990), Macedonian football player
Stevčo Jakimovski (born 1960), Macedonian politician 
Toni Jakimovski (born 1966), Macedonian football manager and former player

Macedonian-language surnames
Polish-language surnames